{{Automatic taxobox
| taxon = Americominella
| image = 
| authority = Klappenbach & Ureta, 1972
| synonyms_ref = 
| synonyms = 
| subdivision_ranks = Genera
| subdivision = See text
|display_parents= 3
}}Americominella is a genus of sea snails, marine gastropod mollusks in the family Eosiphonidae.
 
Species
Species within the genus Afrocominella include:
 Americominella duartei Klappenbach & Ureta, 1972
 Americominella perminuta (Dall, 1927)
Synonyms
 Americominella longisetosus (De Castellanos & Fernandez, 1972): synonym of Americominella duartei'' Klappenbach & Ureta, 1972

References

Eosiphonidae
Gastropod genera